Pentadecane is an alkane hydrocarbon with the chemical formula C15H32. It can be monoterminally oxidized to 1-pentadecanol.

References

Alkanes